Bulkley Junction Provincial Park is a provincial park in British Columbia, Canada, located on the west side of the Skeena River opposite Hazelton. It was established in 1997 and expanded in 2004 from 133 ha. to its current size of 169 ha.

References

Provincial parks of British Columbia
Skeena Country
1997 establishments in British Columbia